Terlet Airfield  is a small airfield in the Netherlands  north of Arnhem in Gelderland and close to Deelen Air Base. It is used mainly by gliders and motor gliders, as well as some light aircraft such as the Aviat Husky, mainly used as tugs for the gliders. It has six grass winchtracks, 04L/22R, 04C/22C, 04R/22L, 12/30, 14R/32L and 14L/32R. From only one strip motorised aircraft are allowed to operate, and only when prior permission is obtained.

The field was founded in 1952 by the Koninklijke Nederlandse Vereniging voor Luchtvaart (Royal Dutch Foundation for Aviation) to promote glider flying, though glider flying has taken place from the area since 1932. It is now home to the largest glider flying association in the Netherlands. Active Gliding clubs on Terlet are: Zweefvliegclub Rotterdam, Zweefvliegclub Deelen, Gelderse Zweefvlieg Club, Delftse Studenten Aeroclub, Gliding Adventures Europe, Kennemer Zweefvlieg Club, the EZZC, ZHVC and Zweefvliegclub Ameland.

References

External links
  Nationaal Zweefvliegcentrum Terlet
 Airliners.net - Photos taken at Terlet

Airports in Gelderland
Buildings and structures in Arnhem